Stonhard, Inc. is an American-based multi-national company specializing in manufacturing and installing high-performance epoxy, polyurethane and methyl methacrylate floor, wall and lining systems. It is an industrial brand of RPM International. Stonhard, Inc. is an ISO-9001 registered company.

Stonhard is headquartered in Maple Shade, NJ.

Company Information

History
Formerly known as The Stonhard Company, Stonhard, Inc. was founded in 1922. Stonhard was privately owned until 1993, when it was acquired by RPM Inc. RPM acquired Stonhard in exchange for $105 million in RPM stock, making Stonhard the largest RPM acquisition at the time. In 1997, RPM formed the RPM Performance Coatings group to manage Stonhard and other operations to provide total corrosion control packages to markets throughout the world.

Leadership
Benjamin Baldwin, Founder
David Dennsteadt, President of RPM Performance Coatings
Greg Michael, President of The Stonhard Group

Brands
Other brands of Stonhard include:
Liquid Elements
Expanko Resilient

International
Stonhard has sales operations in five continents: North America, South America, Europe, Africa and Asia. In total, Stonhard has operations in more than 65 different countries throughout the world.

Services & Products

Services
Stonhard provides products and services for two sectors: Commercial and Industrial. Among the industries and markets:
Manufacturing
Food & Beverage
Chemical Processing
Transportation
Pharmaceutical
Technology & Electronics
Education
Healthcare
Hospitality
Corporate Commercial
Retail Spaces
Government
Aerospace
Stadiums

Products
Stonhard manufactures and installs seamless epoxy, polyurethane and methyl methacrylate flooring products for industrial and commercial environments.

Notable Projects
John F. Kennedy Space Center (NASA Facility)
Madison Square Garden (home of the NBA's New York Knicks and NHL's New York Rangers)
Moses Mabhida Stadium (located in Johannesburg, South Africa; home of the 2010 FIFA World Cup semifinals)
Shearer's Foods (world's first-ever LEED Platinum-certified snack food manufacturing facility)
Rock & Roll Hall of Fame, Cleveland, Ohio
Coriell Institute for Medical Research (biomedical research facility in Camden, NJ)
Cook Children's Hospital (located in Ft. Worth, TX)

External links
 Bloomberg Business: Stonhard, Inc.
The Stonhard Group
Liquid Elements
Expanko Resilient Flooring

References

Companies based in Burlington County, New Jersey